Lohana Bahbangama is a village development committee in Dhanusa District in the Janakpur Zone of south-eastern Nepal. At the time of the 1991 Nepal census it had a population of 4,772 persons living in 824 individual households. It is near to Janakpur. This village is surrounded by (Pra. ko. Mahuwa, Vail, Rampur, and Kuwa).

References

External links
UN map of the municipalities of Dhanusa District

Populated places in Dhanusha District